Sporting District was a term used in the 19th and early 20th centuries to refer to red-light districts, particularly in the United States. It may refer to:

 Sporting District (Omaha, Nebraska)
 San Antonio Sporting District, Texas
 Storyville, New Orleans
 Chestnut Valley, St. Louis
 Tenderloin, Manhattan